Ivakinsky Karyer is a rural locality (a settlement) in Vsevolodo-Vilvenskoye Urban Settlement, Alexandrovsky District, Perm Krai, Russia. The population was 331 as of 2010. There are 10 streets.

Geography 
Ivakinsky Karyer is located 15 km northwest of Alexandrovsk (the district's administrative centre) by road. Vsevolodo-Vilva is the nearest rural locality.

References 

Rural localities in Alexandrovsky District